François-Marie, duc de Broglie, (11 January 167122 May 1745)  was a French military leader.

Biography

Early years
François-Marie de Broglie was the third son of Victor-Maurice, comte de Broglie, named for his grandfather, François Marie.  He entered the army at an early age, and had a varied career of active service before he was made, at the age of twenty-three, lieutenant-colonel of the king's regiment of cavalry.

Career
He served continuously in the War of the Spanish Succession and was present at Malplaquet. He was made lieutenant-general in 1710, and served with Villars in the last campaign of the war and at the Battle of Denain. During the peace he continued in military employment, and in 1719 he was made director-general of cavalry and dragoons. He was also employed in diplomatic missions and was ambassador in England in 1724.

The war in Italy called him into the field again in 1733, and in the following year he was made marshal of France. In the campaign of 1734 he was one of the chief commanders on the French side, and he fought the Battles of Parma and Guastalla. A famous episode was his narrow personal escape when his quarters on the Secchia  (battle of Quistello)   were raided by the enemy on the night of 14 September 1734.

In 1735 he directed a war of positions with credit, but he was soon replaced by Marshal de Noailles. He was governor-general of Alsace when Frederick the Great paid a secret visit to Strasbourg in 1740.

In 1742, during the War of the Austrian Succession, Broglie was appointed to command the French army in Germany, but the only success obtained was in the action of Sahay (25 May 1742), for which he was created duc de Broglie and made a peer of France. He returned to France in 1743, and died two years later.

Personal life
He was the father of Victor-François, 2nd duc de Broglie and Charles-François de Broglie, marquis de Ruffec.

Notes

References

1671 births
1745 deaths
Marshals of France
Francois-Marie
Francois-Marie
French military personnel of the War of the Spanish Succession
French military personnel of the War of the Polish Succession
French military personnel of the War of the Austrian Succession
Peers of France
18th-century French diplomats